Marysia Kay (born 14 December 1975 in Kilmarnock, Scotland) is a retired Scottish actress, singer, and fight performer. She is best known for her role in Forest of the Damned.

Early life
Kay was born in Kilmarnock, East Ayrshire, in the west of Scotland and attended Glasgow University. She moved to London in 2002 and, in 2006, studied drama at City Literary Institute in Covent Garden and stage combat with BASSC. She is a Wiccan and active within Britain's pagan community.

Career
Her first audition was for Forest of the Damned. Her appearances include the short films Record & Erase and Short Lease, and the horror movie Colour from the Dark (filmed in Italy and based upon HP Lovecraft's "The Colour Out of Space"), starring Debbie Rochon.

She also appeared in Alex de Campi's music video for "Those Rules" by The Schema, journalist Rhodri Marsden's experiment in using the Internet to attempt pop success.

During October/November 2010, she directed a production of "Marlowe", a dramatisation of the life of Christopher Marlowe, for the Broken Biscuit Theatre company. It was staged at the Hot Tap Theatre, in New Cross, south London.

Filmography

Films

Television

Stage
 Babalon (2005)
 Samadhi (2005)
 Breathing Corpses (2006)
 The Memory of Water (2006)
 Hedda Gabler (2006)
 The Tempest (2006)
 Hedda Gabler (2009)

Discography

Studio albums

Music videos
 The Schema – "Those Rules You Made"
 The Puppini Sisters – "Jilted"

Awards and nominations
Kay was named Best Actress at the 2010 British Horror Film Awards for her performance in Short Lease, directed by Prano Bailey-Bond and Jennifer Eiss. This 14-minute chiller was itself named Best Film.

References

External links
 Interview with MJ Simpson
 
 Kay's official website
 The Trees of Eternity – Marysia Kay: Live Journal
 Official MySpace

1975 births
Living people
People from Kilmarnock
Scottish film actresses
Alumni of the University of Glasgow
Scottish people of Polish descent
British Wiccans
Scottish modern pagans